The Archdeacon of Down is a senior ecclesiastical officer within the Diocese of Down and Dromore. As such he or she is responsible for the disciplinary supervision of the clergy. within the diocese. The archdeaconry can trace its history back to Bernard who held the office in 1268. The most recent incumbent was David McClay, who was elected Bishop of Down and Dromore on 4 November 2019.

Notable incumbents

Eugene Magennis, Bishop of Down and Connor from 1539 to 1563
Robert Maxwell, Bishop of Kilmore from 1963 to 1661; then Bishop of Kilmore and Ardagh until 
John Richardson (bishop of Ardagh), Bishop of Ardagh from 1633 until 1641
Cuthbert Irvine Peacocke,  Bishop of Derry and Raphoe from 1970 to 1975
 George Alderson Quin,  Bishop of Down and Dromore from 1970 to 1980
Gordon McMullan, Bishop of Down and Dromore from 1986 to 1997
David McClay, consecrated as Bishop of Down and Dromore from 2020.

References

 
Lists of Anglican archdeacons in Ireland
Diocese of Down and Dromore
Religion in Northern Ireland